Emma Dahlström (born 19 July 1992) is a Swedish freestyle skier. Dahlström competed at the 2014 Winter Olympics. She was 112th at the 2012–13 FIS Freestyle Skiing World Cup.

She won a silver medal in the slopestyle event during the FIS Freestyle Ski and Snowboarding World Championships 2017 in Sierra Nevada.

References

External links
 
 
 
 
 

1992 births
Living people
Swedish female freestyle skiers
Olympic freestyle skiers of Sweden
Freestyle skiers at the 2014 Winter Olympics
Freestyle skiers at the 2018 Winter Olympics